Little Ghost may refer to:
 "Little Ghost" (song), a song by The White Stripes from Get Behind Me Satan
 Little Ghost (band), a British alternative rock band
 Little Ghost EP, a 2013 release by the group
 The Little Ghost, a 1966 children's book written by Otfried Preußler
 Das Kleine Gespenst,  translated as "The Little Ghost", 2013 German movie based on the book